Oaxaca earthquake may refer to several earthquakes in or around  what is today the state of Oaxaca, Mexico:

 1787 New Spain earthquake
 1931 Oaxaca earthquake
 1965 Oaxaca earthquake
 1980 Oaxaca earthquake
 1999 Oaxaca earthquake
 2010 Oaxaca earthquake
 2012 Guerrero–Oaxaca earthquake
 2017 Chiapas earthquake